Yu Yu-hsien (1934–1993) was a Taiwanese politician.

Born in 1934 in Taiwan Province, Yu earned a doctorate in agricultural economics from Purdue University. He was appointed to lead the Taiwan Provincial Government Department of Agriculture and Forestry in December 1981. In this position, Yu developed an advertising campaign to increase the rate of consumption of fruits grown in Taiwan, and decrease waste resulting from overproduction. He accomplished the same for excess rice, by reallocating land to be used for growing other grains. Yu was named agriculture minister in July 1988, and retained his office when Hau Pei-tsun assumed the premiership in 1990. Paul Sun replaced Yu in November 1992.

References

1934 births
1993 deaths
Purdue University College of Agriculture alumni
Taiwanese Ministers of Agriculture